Wu Jiangtao (born 5 March 1997) is a Chinese footballer.

Career statistics

Club

Notes

References

1997 births
Living people
Chinese footballers
Chinese expatriate footballers
Association football midfielders
Kategoria e Parë players
Shandong Taishan F.C. players
Wu Jiangtao
Chinese expatriate sportspeople in Thailand
Expatriate footballers in Thailand
Expatriate footballers in Albania